Ginirama is an Indian television drama in the Kannada language that premiered on the Colors Kannada channel on 17 August 2020. The show is official remake of Marathi serial Jeev Zala Yeda Pisa airing on Colors Marathi.

Plot
Ginirama is the story of the talented Mahathi, and Shivaram. Mahathi’s runins with Shivaram, the right-hand man of the local MLA Bhavani leads her to assume that the kind-hearted Shivaram is a ruffian. A game of politics and vendetta ensues between Bhavani and her archrival, where Mahathi and Shivaram are made pawns and forced into a marriage they are not ready for. Them, finding love amidst an ongoing political feud, forms the rest of the story.

Cast 
 Rithvik Mathad as Shivaram  Deshpande , Shrikanth and Vidya's son , Seema's elder brother , Mahathi's husband
 Nayana Nagaraj as Mahathi Deshpande , Vinayak and Sharavati's daughter, Yashas's younger sister, Shivaram's wife
 Chaitra Rao Sachin as Bhavani Byadgi aka Aayi Saheb , Ranadheera's mother, MLA of Lakshmipura
 Sujatha Kurahatti as Vidya  Deshpande, Shrikanth's wife , Shivaram and Seema's mother

 Basavaraj Tiralapur as Srikanth Deshpande, Ramakanth's elder brother , Vidya's husband, Shivaram and Seema's father (dead)
 Kaveri Bagalkote/Sheela as Seema , Shrikant and Vidya's daughter , Shivaram's younger sister
 Lakshmi Siddiah as Sharavati Vinayak Shastri, Vinayak Shastri's wife , Yashas and Mahathi's mother
 Sushma Shekar as Neha , Shivaram's ex-lover 

 Sandeep as Sundaramurthy, Opposition party leader
 Varun Hegde/Ram Pavan as Ranadheer Sahukar, Aayi saheb's son 
 Mruthyunjaya as Ramakanth Deshpande, Shrikanth's younger brother, Sandhya's husband, Prakhyat's father

 Jeeva as Nandya, Shivaram's sidekick and brother-like best friend
 Pradeep Raj as Chotya, Shivaram's sidekick
 Raki Gowda as Gowrav , Mahathi's ex-lover 
 Prassana Jai as Prakhyat , Ramakanth and Sandhya's son
HMT Vijay as Shinde, Aayi Saheb's previous PA
Nikitha Dorthody as Malavika , Seema's Teacher

Adaptations

References 

2020 Indian television series debuts
Indian television soap operas
Kannada-language television shows
Serial drama television series
Colors Kannada original programming